Aiva Aparjode (born 18 February 1977) is a Latvian luger who competed from 1998 to 2006. She finished 18th in the women's singles event at the 2006 Winter Olympics in Turin. Aparjode's best finish at the FIL World Luge Championships was 17th at Nagano in 2004. Her son, Kristers Aparjods and her daughter, Kendija Aparjode, also are lugers.

References
 2006 luge women's singles results
 
 The-sports.org profile

External links
 
 
 

1977 births
Latvian female lugers
Living people
Lugers at the 2006 Winter Olympics
Olympic lugers of Latvia